Mount Berryman is a rural locality in the Lockyer Valley Region, Queensland, Australia.

History 
Mount Berryman State School opened on 25 May 1886 and closed on 27 May 1977. It was at 72 Mount Berryman Road.

In 2007, the Mount Berryman Baptist Church was relocated to the Laidley Pioneer Village.

Education 
There are no schools in Mount Berryman. The nearest primary schools are Blenheim State School in neighbouring Blenheim to the north, Laidley District State School in Laidley to the north-west, and Mount Sylvia State School in Mount Sylvia to the west. The nearest secondary schools are Laidley State High School in Laidley and Lockyer District State High School in Gatton to the north.

References 

Lockyer Valley Region
Localities in Queensland